"Master and Servant" is a song by English electronic music band Depeche Mode, released on 20 August 1984 as the second single from their fourth studio album, Some Great Reward (1984). Its subject matter is BDSM relationships, which caused some controversy, though it has an underlying political theme that is often overlooked by media. It reached number 9 on the UK Singles Chart, number 49 on the US Hot Dance Club Songs chart and number 87 on the US Billboard Hot 100.

Conception and composition
The overtly sexual, BDSM-themed lyrics of "Master and Servant" – including synthesized whip-and-chain sound effects – reportedly meant that the song was banned by many radio stations in the United States (although the song reached the Billboard Hot 100 anyway, albeit only at number 87 and for only a three-week chart stay). The song derived from Martin Gore going to various S&M clubs at the time, which he began to form an idea for the song after "seeing a correlation between what's happening there and life and politics and stuff."

He further stated that it was not just about S&M in 1993 in a VOX magazine:

Reportedly, the song narrowly avoided a radio ban by the BBC as well. "Master and Servant" might have been banned if the one BBC staffer who wanted to ban the record had not been away on holiday at the time the other staffers voted on whether to add "Master and Servant" to their playlist.

Recording and production
The production and mixing process of "Master and Servant" are remembered by Alan Wilder, Daniel Miller, and Gareth Jones, as among the longest that Depeche Mode ever endured. One famous story about the song includes a mixing duration of seven days, and after all the reworking and final mastering of the mix, they realized they left the channel with the snare drum muted during the last chorus.

Some of the sounds on "Master and Servant", such as the whip effect, are based on Daniel Miller standing in the studio hissing and spitting. According to the band, they tried to sample a real whip, but "it was hopeless".

There was studio outtake featuring female backing vocals which were removed in the final release. The vocals were contributed by Inga and Annette Humpe, also known as Humpe Humpe.

Release
The "Slavery Whip Mix" was the longest 12″ Depeche Mode song at the time, with the outro being turned into a swing version of the refrain. The "Voxless" version is an instrumental mix of the song. The B-side is "(Set Me Free) Remotivate Me", featuring a 12-inch "Release Mix". The 7" version edits out much of the beginning.

Some versions include a song called "Are People People?" which uses samples from "People Are People" along with chanting. Both "Are People People?" and "Master and Servant" (An ON-USound Science Fiction Dance Hall Classic) appear on Remixes 81–04 (2004). They were remixed by Adrian Sherwood.

Track listings
All tracks written by Martin L. Gore.

7-inch single
A. "Master and Servant" – 3:46
B. "(Set Me Free) Remotivate Me" – 4:12

US 7-inch single
A. "Master and Servant" (edit) – 3:27
B. "(Set Me Free) Remotivate Me" – 4:12

12-inch single
A. "Master and Servant" (Slavery Whip Mix/12″ Version) – 9:38
B1. "(Set Me Free) Remotivate Me" (Release Mix) – 8:49
B2. "Master and Servant" (Voxless) – 4:00

UK and German limited-edition 12-inch single
A. "Master and Servant" (An ON-USound Science Fiction Dance Hall Classic) – 4:34
B1. "Are People People?" – 4:29
B2. "(Set Me Free) Remotivate Me" (7″ Mix) – 4:12

Track 1 was re-released on the 2- and 3-disc CD versions of Remixes 81–04, while track 2 only appears on the 3-disc version.

US 12-inch single
A. "Master and Servant" (U.S. Black & Blue Version) – 8:02 (edited by Joseph Watt)
B1. "(Set Me Free) Remotivate Me" (12″ Mix) – 7:59 (edited by Joseph Watt)
B2. "Are People People?" – 4:29

CD single (1990)
 "Master and Servant" (Slavery Whip Mix) – 9:38
 "(Set Me Free) Remotivate Me" (Release Mix) – 8:49
 "Master and Servant" (Voxless) – 4:00
 "Master and Servant" (7″ Version) – 3:46

CD single (1991)
 "Master and Servant" – 3:46
 "(Set Me Free) Remotivate Me" – 4:12
 "Master and Servant" (Slavery Whip Mix) – 9:38
 "(Set Me Free) Remotivate Me" (Release Mix) – 8:49
 "Master and Servant" (Voxless) – 4:00

Released as part of the 2 (Singles 7–12) box set.

Charts

Weekly charts

Year-end charts

References

External links
 "Master and Servant" information from the official Depeche Mode website
 AllMusic review 

1984 singles
1984 songs
Depeche Mode songs
Mute Records singles
Song recordings produced by Daniel Miller
Song recordings produced by Gareth Jones
Songs about BDSM
Songs written by Martin Gore
UK Independent Singles Chart number-one singles